The 2017–18 Belarusian Premier League season was the 26th season of the top tier basketball league in Belarus.

Competition format
Ten teams joined the regular season, that consisted in a four-legged round-robin competition. The eight first qualified teams would join the quarterfinals.

Regular season

Second stage

Group A

Group B

Playoffs
Quarterfinals were played in a best-of-three games format and the rest of series in a 2-2-1 format.

Source: BBF.by

5th to 8th place bracket

References

External links 
Belarusian Basketball Federation

Belarusian Premier League (basketball) seasons
Belarus
Premier League